Denis Charles Neville (6 May 1915 – 11 January 1995) was an English football player and manager who managed the Netherlands national team between 1964 and 1966. Upon leaving the Dutch national side, Neville moved back to England to manage non-league side Canvey Island.

He also managed the Danish side Odense Boldklub, Atalanta in Italy, Sparta Rotterdam and Holland Sport.

References

External links
 VoetbalStats.nl 

1915 births
1995 deaths
English footballers
Footballers from Greater London
Association football defenders
Fulham F.C. players
English football managers
Odense Boldklub managers
Atalanta B.C. managers
K. Berchem Sport managers
Sparta Rotterdam managers
SVV Scheveningen managers
Netherlands national football team managers
Canvey Island F.C. managers
English expatriate football managers
English expatriate sportspeople in Denmark
Expatriate football managers in Denmark
English expatriate sportspeople in Italy
Expatriate football managers in Italy
English expatriate sportspeople in Belgium
Expatriate football managers in Belgium
English expatriate sportspeople in the Netherlands
Expatriate football managers in the Netherlands